Stuart Zagnit (sometimes credited as Stan Hart) is an American voice, film and television actor. He has worked in Broadway, off-Broadway, regional and national tours, television, films, commercials, and voice-overs. Zagnit has worked as a voice actor for 4Kids Entertainment, DuArt Film and Video, and TAJ Productions.

Filmography

Film
 According to Greta - Man on Bus
 Across the Sea - Dr. Stein
 Fault - Joe the Wizard
 Jingle Hell - Scott Flynn
 The Testimony of Erin J - Ron S.

Television
 30 Rock - Richard Nixon (in episode Rosemary's Baby)
 The Blacklist - The Haberdasher (in episode "Sutton Ross (No. 17)")
 Blue Bloods - Karl (in episode "Dedication")
 Bull -  Potential Juror #11 (in episode "Potential Juror #11")
 Celebrity Ghost Stories - Willy Stiller (in episode "Jerry Stiller, Mindy McCready, Nick Hogan, Lourdes Benedicto")
 Elementary - Josef Shapiro (in episode "Rip Off")
 Instinct - Rabbi (in episode "Bad Actors")
 Law & Order - Harry Shapiro, DDS (in episode "I.D."), Carson (in episode "Justice"), Jim Roker (in episode "Girl Most Likely")
 Law & Order: Criminal Intent - LeMoyne (in episode "Malignant")
 Law & Order: Special Victims Unit - Harrison Barnett (in episode "Folly")
 Small Miracles - Benjamin Metzger (in episode "The Wall")
 The Good Wife - Judge Larry Reardon (in episode "Innocents")

Voice roles
 Baki the Grappler - Koushou Shinogi, Seicho Kato
 Boundary Break - The Real Professor Oak (in episode "Pokemon Snap")
 Chaotic - Additional Voices
 Grappler Baki: The Ultimate Fighter - Kosho Shinogi / Seicho Kato 
 Lost Kingdoms II
 Mission Odyssey -  Poseidon
 Napoleon - Penguin
 Pokémon - Professor Oak, Koga, Cedric Juniper
 Shaman King - Additional Voices
 Slayers - Zolf
 Teenage Mutant Ninja Turtles (2003) - Dr. Dome (in episode "Return of the Justice Force"), Zanramon 
 The Irresponsible Captain Tylor - Dr. Hidezaburo Kitaguchi, Admiral Yutta Do Lonawer (Eps. 9-10)
 Twin Angels - Dekinobu, Tokihara
 Viva Pinata - Additional Voices
 Winx Club (4Kids Entertainment edit) - Mike

Theatre
2022: Little Shop of Horrors - Off-Broadway - Mr. Mushnik
2021: Caroline, or Change - Broadway - Grandpa Gellman
2015: Wicked - Munchkinland National Tour - The Wonderful Wizard of Oz
2015: The Producers - John Engeman Theater, Northport, L.I. - Max Bialystock
2014: Dr. Seuss' How the Grinch Stole Christmas! The Musical - Broadway - Grandpa Who
2012: Newsies - Broadway - Swing
2011: The People In The Picture - Broadway - US Krinsky/Doovie
2011: The Merry Wives of Windsor (Terrace) - Brooklyn, NY - Sir John Falstaff
2009: Dr. Seuss' How the Grinch Stole Christmas! The Musical - Pantages Theater - L.A., CA - Grandpa Who;
2009: On The Waterfront - site-specific staged reading at Brooklyn, Manhattan and NJ venues with Brave New World Rep. Theatre - Johnny Friendly;
2009: Diary of Anne Frank - Syracuse Stage, NY - Mr. Dussel;
2008: Dr. Seuss' How the Grinch Stole Christmas! The Musical - National Tour, Baltimore, MD & Boston, MA - Grandpa Who;
2007: Fiddler On The Roof - Syracuse Stage, NY - Tevye
2005: Picon Pie - Off-Broadway, DR2 & The Lambs - Jacob 'Yonkel' Kalich
2000: Seussical The Musical - Broadway - The Mayor of Whoville
2000: The Wild Party (musical, LaChiusa) - Broadway  - Goldberg
1988-90  Into the Woods - National Tour - The Steward(u/s) Baker, Narrator/Mysterious Man, Cinderella's Father
1987: Little Shop of Horrors - Off-Broadway - Seymour

References

External links
 
 
 https://www.linkedin.com/in/stuart-zagnit-3710753b

1952 births
Living people
Male actors from New Jersey
American male voice actors
People from New Brunswick, New Jersey